"Forevermore" is a song by Malaysian singer-songwriter Yuna, released as the first single from her fourth international studio album (her seventh overall), Rouge. The song, which tells about Yuna's life experience grew up in Malaysia, it was co-written by Yuna, Alexandra Govere and Robin Hannibal and released on 5 April 2019 by Verve Music Group.

Commercial performance
"Forevermore" debuted at number-one on Malaysia's RIM Domestic Chart on 11 April 2019, her first number-one since the reintroduction of the official chart in 2017.

Music video
The music video for "Forevermore" was produced by 33.3 Creative and filmed in 11 locations in Malaysia including Kuala Lumpur and Perlis, it was directed by Yuna's husband, Adam Sinclair. According to her, the song is about growing up in a small town and coming from a small country and how that "environment made me strive to be the best that I can be". The official music video was released on the same day.

Since its release, the video has garnered more than 3 million views.

Format and track listing
 Digital download
 "Forevermore" – 3:53

Personnel
Song
 Yunalis Zarai – vocal
 Yunalis Zarai, Robin Hannibal – composition

Music video
 Adam Sinclair – director
 Edwin Raj & Ian Kirk – producer
 Samuel Lam – director of photography
 Rabbani Sujak – art director
 Karma Raines – choreographer
 Kroll Azry – assistant director
 Haida Yusof-Yeomans – stylist

Charts

Release history

References

2019 singles
2019 songs
Songs written by Yuna (singer)
Yuna (singer) songs
Songs written by Shungudzo
Songs written by Robin Hannibal